The John Geist and Sons Blacksmith Shop and House is a building located in Nashville, Tennessee. It was listed on the National Register of Historic Places listings in Davidson County, Tennessee (NRHP) in 1980. The business finally closed in 2006. In 2018 the building and site were developed and a restaurant opened in the blacksmith building.

History

The John Geist and Sons Blacksmith Shop and House was one of Nashville’s oldest businesses to remain in continuous family ownership and operation (1886 to 2006). The first building constructed on the site in 1886 was a frame house: in 1900 a new brick building was built on the site and it remains today. When the automobile began to supplant the horse as transportation John Geist began to offer decorative ironwork. Until 2018 the building was still owned by the Geist family.

The building was added to the National Register of Historic Places listings in Davidson County, Tennessee (NRHP) on April 29, 1980.

Redevelopment
The building is located in the Historic Germantown Neighborhood. The property, includes three buildings and in 2013 a Nashville developer became involved in coming up with uses for the property. In 2018 a restaurant called "Geist" was developed and it opened in the renovated blacksmith building. The restaurant's website states that it the building houses a Bar and a Dining Room which features handcrafted items from Local Artisans. they also claim to have a Champagne Garden, and a courtyard with an outdoor cooking stove.

See also
List of blacksmith shops

References

1886 establishments in Tennessee
National Register of Historic Places in Nashville, Tennessee
Buildings and structures in Nashville, Tennessee
Commercial buildings on the National Register of Historic Places in Tennessee
Commercial buildings completed in 1900
Blacksmith shops
Restaurants in Nashville, Tennessee
Geography of Nashville, Tennessee
Tourist attractions in Tennessee
Tourist attractions in Nashville, Tennessee